Joe William Davis (October 22, 1918 – November 14, 1992) was an American politician who served as mayor of Huntsville, Alabama, for five consecutive terms from 1968 to 1988. He unsuccessfully sought a sixth term. Davis is the second-longest-serving mayor of Huntsville, behind only Alex W. McAllister.

Born in nearby New Market, Alabama, Davis had worked as a teacher and a businessman before becoming Huntsville's mayor. He was a veteran of World War II. Married with a family, Davis was a Freemason and member of Helion Lodge #1 in Huntsville. He is buried at Maple Hill Cemetery in Huntsville.

Tributes
The Joe W. Davis Stadium in Huntsville, home of the Huntsville Stars baseball team from 1985 through 2014, is named in his honor.

References 

1918 births
1992 deaths
Mayors of Huntsville, Alabama
People from Madison County, Alabama
20th-century American politicians
Military personnel from Huntsville, Alabama
American military personnel of World War II
American Freemasons